is a Japanese animator and character designer affiliated with Xebec. Some of Ishihara's major character design works include the Megaman NT Warrior anime series, D.I.C.E., Rin: Daughters of Mnemosyne, and Tokyo ESP.

Filmography

References

 Book references

External links
 

1969 births
Anime character designers
Japanese animators
Living people